Martin Graiciar (born 11 April 1999) is a Czech professional footballer who last played as a forward for Canadian club York United.

Career
Graiciar spent time on loan at Arsenal's youth setup. He went on loan to Liberec from Fiorentina in January 2017. He made his senior league debut for Liberec on 11 March 2017 in a Czech First League 1–0 loss at Plzeň. He scored his first league goals on 19 August in Liberec's 3–0 away win at Mladá Boleslav, when he scored twice.

On 9 July 2019, Graiciar joined to his former club Sparta Prague on loan with an option to buy.

On 7 January 2022, Graiciar signed a two-year contract with Canadian Premier League side York United, with a club option for a further year. However, he suffered an injury in preseason and never appeared for the club, with him and the club ultimately opting to mutually terminate the contract.

References

External links
 
 Martin Graiciar official international statistics
 
 Martin Graiciar profile on the FC Slovan Liberec official website

Living people
1999 births
Association football forwards
Czech footballers
Sportspeople from Karlovy Vary
Czech expatriate footballers
Czech expatriate sportspeople in England
Expatriate footballers in England
Czech expatriate sportspeople in Italy
Expatriate footballers in Italy
Czech expatriate sportspeople in Canada
Expatriate soccer players in Canada
Czech First League players
ACF Fiorentina players
FC Slovan Liberec players
AC Sparta Prague players
FK Mladá Boleslav players
York United FC players
Czech Republic under-21 international footballers
Czech Republic youth international footballers